Alessandro Polita (born 3 June 1984) is an Italian motorcycle racer, winner of the FIM Superstock 1000 Cup in 2006. His sister, Alessia Polita, also ran as a professional rider, until an accident caused paralysis of the lower limbs.

Career 
In 2006  he won the World Cup Superstock 1000 with a Suzuki GSXR1000 K6 Celani with the Suzuki Italian team. In 2007 he debuted in the World Superbike championship with the same team. That season, where Polita reported some injuries, he rode his Suzuki GSX-R1000 K6 to eight World Championship points, earned him  24th place overall.

In 2008 he joined team Sterilgarda Go Eleven for racing with a Ducati 1098 in the Superstock 1000 FIM Cup. He ended the season in third place. He won the Grand Prix of San Marino at Misano Adriatico.

In 2009 he returned to World Superbike with the Sterilgarda team, but the economic crisis some sponsors to withdraw, forcing the team from Brescia to play in the season with only Shane Byrne.

After a few weeks, however Polita moved over to the World Supersport Championship riding the Suzuki GSX-R600 for the Hoegee Suzuki team. On 13 June 2009, following the withdrawal by team Hoegee due to economic problems he was again left without a ride.

On July 4, 2009, he inked an agreement with the Celani Race team to participate in the World Superbike, replacing Karl Muggeridge from the San Marino Grand Prix.

In 2010 he participated in the Italian Superbike Championship with a Ducati 1098 Team, Barni Racing . He won the title with a race before the end of the season, winning two races and standing on the podium in all the races on the calendar, surpassing the 41 points of his teammate Stefano Cruciani.

In 2011 he repeated his participation in the Italian Speed Championship with Team Barni Ducati and in some of the World Superbike races as a wild card .

He debuted at the Tourist Trophy for the 2016 edition, reaching 47º in the category Superbike race and 40th in the Superstock.

Since the end of 2018 he started racing in the IDM Superbike 1000 in a Honda CBR 1000 RR for the team Holzhauer Racing Promotion. He managed only one third place, in the Most race 1. He managed to score 152 points at the end of that season. He is still scheduled to race for the team at the 2020 season.

References

External links
 
 Profile on WorldSBK.com

1984 births
Living people
People from Iesi
Superbike World Championship riders
Supersport World Championship riders
FIM Superstock 1000 Cup riders
Italian motorcycle racers
British Superbike Championship riders
Sportspeople from the Province of Ancona